Daryapur is a city located in the Amravati District of Maharashtra State, India. It belongs to the Vidarbha region of the Amravati Division. It is located 52 km (32.31m) west of the District headquarters of Amravati.

Geography
Daryapur is located at 20.9300° N, 77.3300° E and coordinates at an average elevation of 288m .https://www.latlong.net/place/daryapur-maharashtra-india-11715.html

Demographics
According to the 2011 India Census, Daryapur Banosa is a Municipal Council city in the district of Amravati, Vidarbha. The city of Daryapur Banosa is divided into 20 wards in which elections are held every 5 years. The Daryapur Banosa Municipal Council has a population of 36,463 people out of which 18,590 are males while 17,873 are females as per a report released by the 2011 India Census. 
The population of children aged 0–6 is 10.3% (3769) of total population of Daryapur, Banosa. According to municipal council the female sex ratio is 961 though the state average is 929. Moreover, the child sex ratio is around 866 as compared to Maharashtra state average which is 894. The literacy rate of Daryapur Banosa city is 89.74% higher than the state average of 82.34%. Specifically, male literacy is around 92.68% while the female literacy rate is 86.72%.

Daryapur Banosa Municipal Council accounts to a total administration over 7,625 houses to which it supplies basic amenities like water and electricity. Water supplied to houses come from Shahanur dam which does not require electricity, and works completely on gravitational energy. Daryapur and Anjangaon hold records in the Limca book for supplying water without electricity. It is also authorized to build roads within Municipal Council limits and impose taxes on properties coming under its jurisdiction.

About
Daryapur (Banosa) is a city and a municipal council in Amravati district in the state of Maharashtra, India.  Daryapur is situated on the bank of the Chandrabhaga river. The town derives its name from Darya Imad Shah the 3rd independent Kings of Berar (AD 1526–1560) who founded Daryapur.
Daryapur's education includes Prabodhan Vidyalaya Daryapur, Adarsh High School Daryapur and other schools. Daryapur is also a cotton producing town with ginning and pressing factories. It also produces cereals like 'Mung' and 'Chana'. Soybean production in blooming in recent years . Daryapur Municipal Council comprises three separate towns i.e. Daryapur, Banosa and Babhali. Daryapur is the main town where the Municipal Council, ST Bus Stand, and main schools are situated. There is only a narrow-gauge rail line separating Banosa from Daryapur. Babhali and Banosa are separated by the river "Chandrabhaga". Sarvajanik Vachanalaya is a 104-year-old library which was founded in 1912 and is now run by a trust in which (late) Shri. Shridhar Dhondopant Vaidya and Shri Sudhir Bhanudaspant Dharmadhikari struggled hard to set up this Vachanalaya and now Girish Dattatraya Bhadekar is librarian of Sarvajanik Vachanalaya and recipient of "GRANTH MITRA PURASKAR" 2008.

Places of interest in and around Daryapur include:

 The Cotton Mill
 Kolhapuri Gate
 Asha-Manisha Temple
 Anandeshwar Mahadev Temple at Lasur
 Sant Gadge Baba Temple
 Parashram Maharaj Temple-Pimplod
 Shivgiri Maharaj Lehgaon
 Gajanan Maharaj Temple-Shiwar
 Chandika Devi Temple at Chendikapur (of Nandkishor, Pranjali AND P.W.C.)
 Navaji Baba Temple Sasan BK

Education
Daryapur's educational institutions include Adarsh High School Daryapur, Prabodhan Vidyalaya, Kokilaben Gawande Mahila Mahavidyalaya, which offer both undergraduate and postgraduate programs for girls. Other educational institutions include Maulana Azad Urdu High School, Shamim Azad High School, Adarsh Mahavidyalaya 

Notable graduates from these schools include:

 Pranav Gawande
 Vaibhav Gawande
 Ramrao Deshmukh
 Panjabrao Deshmukh
 Vijay Bhatkar
 Avinash Bayaskar

Daraypur's education system is operated by the Central Board of Secondary Education, New Delhi.

See also
Khallar

References

Cities and towns in Amravati district
Talukas in Maharashtra